Karin Schuitema (born 1969) is a road cyclist from the Netherlands. In 1987 she won bronze at the Dutch National Road Race Championships. She participated at the 1988 UCI Road World Championships in the Women's team time trial.

References

External links
 profile at dewielersite.net

1969 births
Living people
Dutch female cyclists
UCI Road World Championships cyclists for the Netherlands
Place of birth missing (living people)
Date of birth missing (living people)
People from Veendam
Cyclists from Groningen (province)